Krishna is an Indian film and television actor. He is best known for playing the lead role in the Deivamagal as Prakash which telecasted on Sun TV.

Early life and education
Krishna was born in Chennai. His parents had migrated from Tamil Nadu to New Delhi after his birth, and he grew up in New Delhi. He obtained his formal education from Kendriya Vidyalaya and  Birla Institute of Technology, Noida. He also did a three-month course in acting from Asian Academy of Film & Television (AAFT) Noida.

Career 
After completing his degree in Delhi, he flew to Chennai to begin a career in acting. His first role was in the Tamil serial Sahana, a sequel of Sindhu Bhairavi directed by K. Balachander. He portrayed the character Surya, son of JKB.

Krishna was offered to perform the role of a cancer patient in Kamal Haasan starrer Vasool Raja MBBS but couldn't sign the project. He was later offered a role in director Saran's Idhaya Thirudan. In 2010 he played a negative role named Jeeva in the Tamil movie Anadhapurathu Veedu.

He acted in the TV serial Deivamagal where he played the protagonist role of Prakash, and in the suspense-thriller serial,  Chidambara Rahasiyam where he played the character Somu both broadcast on Sun TV. In 2019 he acted in the TV serial Run.  In 2020 Krishna acted in Nayagi (Season 2)  as Ezhil. He now is acting in Thalattu.

Filmography

Television 
Serials

Shows

Theatre
Oru Koodai Paasam (2009) – Directed by K.Balachandher

Awards and nominations

Personal life
He is married to Indian actress Chaya Singh. Their marriage was held in June 2012.

References

External links 

Living people
Tamil male actors
Indian male film actors
Tamil male television actors
Television personalities from Tamil Nadu
Male actors from Chennai
Male actors in Tamil cinema
21st-century Tamil male actors
Year of birth missing (living people)